Campylocentrum micranthum is a species of orchid. It is native to an area from Jalisco east to Puerto Rico and south to Bolivia and Brazil.

References

micranthum
Orchids of Mexico
Orchids of Central America
Orchids of South America
Flora of the Caribbean
Plants described in 1835
Flora without expected TNC conservation status